Noventi Ventures is a venture capital firm founded in 2002 by Giacomo Marini and it was previously known as CIR Ventures.

The Noventi team includes: Giacomo Marini, Masa Ishii, Pierluigi Zappacosta.

The Investment Advisory Committee of Noventi includes Rodolfo De Benedetti, Claudio Stabon, Pierluigi Ferrero.

Portfolio
Noventi Ventures has provided venture capital and active support to the following companies:

Notes

References

External links 
 Noventi Ventures website

Companies based in Menlo Park, California
Financial services companies established in 2002
Venture capital firms of the United States
2002 establishments in California